Mercurol-Veaunes is a commune in the Drôme department of southeastern France. The municipality was established on 1 January 2016 and consists of the former communes of Mercurol and Veaunes.

Population

References

See also 
Communes of the Drôme department

Communes of Drôme

Communes nouvelles of Drôme
Populated places established in 2016
2016 establishments in France